The Hornblower Hybrid is a family of ferry boats belonging to US operator Hornblower Cruises, which are powered with hybrid power trains.

San Francisco Hornblower Hybrid 

The San Francisco Hornblower Hybrid is a  catamaran, with a fully enclosed main deck, and covered roof deck. In 2008 the vessel was acquired by Alcatraz Cruises, a subsidiary of Hornblower Cruises. The vessel, which was previously a commercial diving boat, underwent a retrofit, repower and refurbishment operation, at a cost of USD 4 million.

In addition to its main power train, which consists of Tier 2 marine diesel engines, the Hornblower Hybrid uses power generated by two ten-foot-tall twisted Savonius wind turbines and a photovoltaic solar array covering the awning on the top deck. That supplementary power is converted and stored in batteries which power the navigation equipment, lighting, and electronics on board. Excess power can be stored in the main propulsion battery banks. The ship was presented as the first passenger boat in the US to use both wind and sun power.

The drive system allows the captain to monitor the energy needs of the vessel and select the most appropriate power sources. For example, when the boat is idle at the dock, the engines may shut off so that the motors may run on energy stored in the battery banks.

The vessel also contains a number of other environmentally friendly materials. The carpeting contains post consumer recycled materials, is recyclable and meets the US Green Building Council LEED criteria for recycled content. A significant portion of the interior signage is printed on Plyboo, a composite material made from sustainable sources and containing no harmful chemicals. The lighting throughout the vessel is LED.

The ship was mentioned among the Workboat Significant Boats of 2009 list. It was a finalist in the Sustainable Shipping awards.

New York Hornblower Hybrid 

Two years after the introduction of the San Francisco vessel, Hornblower Cruises subsidiary Statue Cruises announced works on a second ship. The New York Hornblower Hybrid was completed on October 26, 2011.

In addition to using solar power, wind power, and low-emission diesel, the New York Hornblower Hybrid also runs on hydrogen fuel cells, making it the first hydrogen hybrid ferry in the world.  The Hybrid is 168 feet long by 40 feet wide and designed to carry 600 passengers.  It features two Helix wind 5-kilowatt wind turbines, a 20 kilowatt solar array, LEED certified carpets, LED lighting, and an interior made partly of recycled and sustainable materials.

Alcatraz Clipper Hybrid 

The Alcatraz Clipper Hybrid was originally constructed in the early 1970s as a vessel to serve Catalina Island. Hornblower Cruises subsidiary Alcatraz Cruises acquired the vessel in 2008 and retrofitted it to have Tier II engines with a Selective Catalytic Reduction (SCR) units. In 2011 Alcatraz Cruises implemented Hornblower's Hybrid technology.

Environmental impact 
In 2008, the operator announced it hoped to achieve 75% fuel consumption reduction thanks to the San Francisco Hornblower Hybrids technology, however no independent evaluation of the vessel's ecological impact has been published.

References

Ferries of California
Hybrid vehicles